Teramo Cristoforo Castelli (1597 – 3 October 1659) was an Italian Theatine missionary, born of a noble family, who spent twenty-two years in Georgia from 1632 to 1654. He left seven volumes of travel notes and pen-and-ink sketches and other illustrations, mainly of the people and landscapes of Georgia. This manuscript was discovered and delivered to the municipal library of Palermo by the priest Gioacchino di Marzo in 1878 and brought to the attention of scholars of Georgia by Michel Tamarati in 1910.

References 

1597 births
1659 deaths
Kartvelian studies scholars
Theatines
Italian Roman Catholic missionaries
17th-century Roman Catholics
Missionary linguists